Rayshaun Hammonds (born November 10, 1998) is an American professional basketball player for BG Göttingen of the Basketball Bundesliga. He played college basketball for the Georgia Bulldogs.

High school career
Hammonds attended Norcross High School. In the summer of 2016, he averaged 18 points, eight rebounds, and nearly two steals and two assists per game in the Nike EYBL. As a senior, Hammonds averaged 18 points and 11 rebounds per game and led the team to the Class 7A final. He was named Gwinnett County player of the year by the Atlanta Journal-Constitution. He was considered a four-star prospect, ranked the 38th best player in his class by ESPN. On his 18th birthday, November 10, 2016, Hammonds committed to Georgia over offers from Texas, Miami (Florida) and Memphis.

College career
In his debut versus Bryant, Hammonds became the first Georgia freshman to start his first game since Kentavious Caldwell-Pope in 2011 and finished with 17 points. As a freshman at Georgia, Hammonds averaged 6.7 points and 4.9 rebounds per game. On November 19, 2018, Hammonds scored a career-high 31 points in an 80–68 win against Illinois State in the Cayman Islands Classic. He averaged 12.1 points and 6.1 rebounds per game as a sophomore. Hammonds suffered a foot injury against Ole Miss on February 23, 2019, and was ruled out for the season on March 7. As a junior, he served as a complementary place to Anthony Edwards, posting five double-doubles and scored a season-high 26 points twice. Hammonds averaged 12.9 points and 7.4 rebounds per game, shooting 35 percent from three-point range. Following the season, he declared for the 2020 NBA draft but did not initially hire an agent. On May 3, 2020, Hammonds decided to remain in the draft, forfeiting his remaining year of collegiate eligibility.

Professional career
After going undrafted in the 2020 NBA draft, Hammonds signed with the Indiana Pacers. On December 18, he was waived by the Pacers.

On January 11, 2021, Hammonds was signed by the Fort Wayne Mad Ants of the NBA G League. He averaged 6.1 points and 4.8 rebounds per game. On August 26, 2021, Hammonds signed with VEF Rīga of the LEBL.

On July 25, 2022, he has signed with BG Göttingen of the Basketball Bundesliga.

Career statistics

College

|-
| style="text-align:left;"| 2017–18
| style="text-align:left;"| Georgia
| 33 || 26 || 24.2 || .421 || .286 || .695 || 4.9 || 1.4 || .5 || .2 || 6.7
|-
| style="text-align:left;"| 2018–19
| style="text-align:left;"| Georgia
| 28 || 27 || 24.3 || .492 || .366 || .806 || 6.1 || 1.6 || .9 || .4 || 12.1
|-
| style="text-align:left;"| 2019–20
| style="text-align:left;"| Georgia
| 32 || 32 || 28.0 || .464 || .350 || .652 || 7.4 || 1.5 || .8 || .4 || 12.9
|- class="sortbottom"
| style="text-align:center;" colspan="2"| Career
| 93 || 85 || 25.5 || .462 || .339 || .722 || 6.1 || 1.5 || .7 || .3 || 10.5

References

External links
Georgia Bulldogs bio

1998 births
Living people
American men's basketball players
Basketball players from Georgia (U.S. state)
BG Göttingen players
Fort Wayne Mad Ants players
Georgia Bulldogs basketball players
Norcross High School alumni
People from Norcross, Georgia
Small forwards
Sportspeople from the Atlanta metropolitan area